High energy ignition, also known as H.E.I., is an electronic ignition system designed by the Delco-Remy Division of General Motors. It was used on all GM vehicles, at least in the North American market, from 1975 through the mid-1980s. There were many design variations over the years, and provisions for computer controls were added for some applications starting in the late 1970s. A predecessor system called "Unitized Ignition" was optional on 1972 and 1973 Pontiacs. 

Most—but not all—HEI systems have the ignition coil mounted in the distributor cap. A control module and magnetic pickup are mounted in the distributor, in place of a conventional ignition system's breaker points and condenser.

Control modules
There are four basic types of HEI control modules: four-, five-, seven-, and eight-pin. The four-pin module was used on carbureted engines and uses conventional mechanical timing controls (vacuum and centrifugal advance mechanisms). The five-pin module was introduced in 1978 and was an early attempt at electronic timing control; it contains a provision for connecting a knock sensor. The seven- and eight-pin modules are used on early computer-controlled engines in conjunction with fixed-timing distributors, as the computer controls the ignition timing.

Upgrading
HEI distributors are a popular swap on older GM cars originally equipped with points and condenser type ignition systems. The HEI system produces a more powerful spark, which allows for a wider spark plug gap for surer ignition of a fuel/air mix that may not be optimal. The HEI setup has also become a popular swap into non-GM vehicles.

References

External links 
 http://delcoremyhistory.com/history.htm
 http://www.pontiacpower.org/HEI.pdf
 http://delcoremyhistory.com/history.htm
 https://saemobilus.sae.org/content/750346/#abstract

Ignition systems